The Arad Administrative Palace is an historic building located at 75 Revoluției Boulevard, Arad, Romania. It houses the city hall and the prefecture of Arad County.

History
The initial location of the town hall was in the Avram Iancu Square from the 17th century. Following the development of the city and the shift of the center from Avram Iancu to the new areas, the city council decided to build another one closer to the new core of the city. They hired the Budapestan architect Ödön Lechner, who came up with a design. Due to financial problems, the project was found impossible to build. After that they hired another architect, Ferenc Pekar who modified the blueprints, cutting out some of the elements. Built between 1872 and 1876, it was inaugurated in 1877.

Architecture
Its tower is reminiscent of the Flemish town halls and the ornamentation draws from the Flemish renaissance. The timepiece was brought from Switzerland in the year of the inauguration and it still is functional. The stained glass were painted by the Aradean artist Sever Frențiu and they represented the seasons.

External links
Brief history of the Administrative Palace from Arad (the building of the City Hall of Arad), written by Péter Puskel

Historic monuments in Arad County
Buildings and structures in Arad, Romania
Tourist attractions in Arad County
Prefecture buildings in Romania
City and town halls in Romania
Government buildings completed in 1876